Victor Ray Wilson (February 20, 1959 – April 30, 1996), better known as Beatmaster V, was an American musician and drummer of metal band Body Count.

Early life

Wilson grew up in South Central, Los Angeles, and attended Crenshaw High School with Ice-T and Ernie C. As a musician he participated in music wherever he could, including church music with his local church.

In his community and church, as a youth, Beatmaster V practiced drums and other instruments. He excelled in his musical ability at an early age. By the time he was 11 years old he played with the blues musician Lou Rawls, as a drummer. He continued on and took drum classes, and built more musical skill playing with various musicians like Ernie C.

Music career
Along with guitarist Ernie C, vocalist Ice-T, bassist Mooseman and rhythm guitarist D-Roc, Wilson formed the heavy metal band Body Count during the recording of Ice-T's fourth hip hop album, O.G. Original Gangster. Musically, later, after their many days of rehearsing and performing, Beatmaster V and Ernie C. ended up in the same L.A. band, Body Count. The band was founded by Ice T. & the other bandmates. After initially presenting the Body Count band sounds in L.A. clubs and venues Body Count went on to perform in the original Lollapalooza), & many other events and places across America & around the world.

Death 
Wilson died of leukemia in 1996.

Jonathon James, a family member, played with Bodycount as a backup drummer on the album Violent Demise: The Last Days in place of Wilson.

References

1959 births
1996 deaths
Musicians from Los Angeles
African-American drummers
African-American rock musicians
Place of death missing
Place of birth missing
American heavy metal drummers
Body Count (band) members
Deaths from leukemia
American rock drummers
20th-century American drummers
American male drummers
Deaths from cancer in the United States
Crenshaw High School alumni
20th-century American male musicians